Calum Puttergill (born 22 October 1993) is a South African-born Australian tennis player.

Puttergill has a career high ATP singles ranking of 663 achieved on 24 February 2020. He also has a career high ATP doubles ranking of 244 achieved on 7 November 2022.

Puttergill made his ATP main draw debut at the 2021 Great Ocean Road Open in the doubles draw partnering Scott Puodziunas.

ATP Challenger and ITF Futures finals

Singles: 1 (0–1)

Doubles: 15 (8–7)

References

External links

1993 births
Living people
Australian male tennis players
People from Mthatha
Sportspeople from the Sunshine Coast
Tennis people from Queensland
South African emigrants to Australia